The term Chinese currency may refer to:

Renminbi, the currency of the People's Republic of China
New Taiwan dollar, the currency of the Republic of China (Taiwan)
Hong Kong dollar, the currency of Hong Kong SAR
Yuan (currency), the base unit of a number of former and present-day currencies in China.

Historical
Chinese cash (currency unit)
Ancient Chinese coinage